Servant of God Cícero Romão Batista, known as Father Cícero (March 24, 1844 – July 20, 1934), was a Brazilian Catholic priest who became a spiritual leader to the people of Northeastern Brazil. In the course of his ministry, he was accused of heresy by Catholic Church officials, eventually becoming suspended but not formally excommunicated.

Batista has been declared a saint by the Brazilian Catholic Apostolic Church. He was listed in the Top 100 Greatest Brazilians of All Time in July 2012. The official reconciliation with the Roman Catholic Church happened in December 2015 and his beatification process opened on August 20, 2022 after the Dicastery for the Causes of Saints issued the official "nihil obstat" (no objections to the cause) edict and titled him as a Servant of God.

Biography
Batista was born in the Municipality of Crato, Ceará, in 1844, the son of Joaquim Romão Batista and Joaquina Vicência Romana. When he was six years old, he started to study under Rufino de Alcântara Montezuma. In his youth, he took a vow of chastity, made when he was twelve years old.  This was influenced by his reading the life of Francis de Sales.

In 1860, Batista went to school in Cajazeiras, but because of the untimely death of his father in 1862, he had to return home to his mother and sisters. The death of his father, who was a small businessman in Crato, brought serious financial difficulties to his family.

Batista was ordained a priest on November 30, 1870. After his ordination he returned to Crato and taught Latin in the Colégio Padre Ibiapina, founded and directed by José Joaquim Teles Marrocos, his cousin and friend.

Juazeiro

For Christmas of 1871, invited by his teacher Simeão Correia de Macedo, Batista visited for the first time the small community of Juazeiro (which at the time was part of Crato) and celebrated the traditional Missa do galo (Mass at Dawn).

Batista, who was 28 years old, impressed the locals.  And he was impressed by them. So after a few months, on April 11, 1872, he was back in Juazeiro with his family and suitcases, to stay there as a permanent resident.

Many books state that Batista decided to stay in Juazeiro because of a dream or vision that he had.  This supposed dream occurred after a long day of hearing confessions, when he looked for a room to rest in and fell asleep. According to his close friends, he saw Jesus Christ and the twelve apostles sitting at a table, similar to Leonardo da Vinci's Last Supper.  Suddenly, the place was full of poor Northeastern Brazilians. Christ, looking to the poor, said that he was upset with humanity, but that he was still willing to do the last sacrifice to save the world. But, if men didn't repent quickly, he was going to destroy everything at once. At that moment, he pointed to the poor and, said, "And you, Padre Cícero, take care of them!"

In 1889, when Maria de Araujo received Holy Communion from Batista, her mouth started to bleed. While the local people saw this as a miracle, church authorities suspected other causes. The Holy Office in Rome charged him with heresy and mystification. His faculties to celebrate Mass and the sacraments were suspended in 1894, though he continued to celebrate Mass at his church. In 1898, he met with Pope Leo XIII in Rome, and he was granted a partial reprieve.

Apostleship
Batista initially started work on the small local chapel, getting different images with the offerings of the faithful. Afterwards, touched by the burning desire to win over the people that God confided into his care, he started intense preaching.  He gave many counsels, and made many visits to homes, starting to exercise great leadership in the community.  Also, he began to try to change the immoral customs of the people, personally getting rid of excessive drunkenness and prostitution.

With harmony restored, the community started to grow. Many people from neighboring communities were attracted by the new large chapel.

Politician
His relationship with politics began in 1901 with the visit of Count von de Brule, on a mission from the Secretariat of the Interior of Ceará, to land he owned in Crato, in the town of Taboca, where there was knowledge of oil shale outcrops of economic importance. Only in 1919, the then governor of Ceará, João Tomé de Saboia e Silva, would visit the outcrops and order the construction of galleries, who would later be named Mina Santa Rosa. Due to excessive heat and poor ventilation, work was interrupted for two years. In 1921, the Federal Inspectorate of Works against Droughht financed drilling in this land and in October 1922, the chemist, geologist and mineralogist Sylvio Froes Abreu, then aged nineteen, reported that the bituminous shale contained potential for the production of lubricating oils and fuels. 

Batista was actively involved in the politics of his time and was a member of the Conservative Republican Party of Brazil. When Juazeiro was raised to the status of a municipality in 1911, he was appointed its first mayor. He governed the city in this capacity for most of the next twenty years. In 1926 he was elected federal deputy, but he did not take office. On October 4, 1911, he and sixteen other political leaders from the region met in Juazeiro and signed a mutual cooperation agreement, as well as a commitment to support Governor Antônio Pinto Nogueira Accioli. The meeting was nicknamed the Pact of Colonels, being considered an important passage in the history of Brazilian coronelismo.

In 1913, he was removed from office by Governor Marcos Franco Rabelo, returning to power in 1914, when Franco Rabelo was deposed in the event that became known as the Juazeiro Sedition. He was also elected vice-governor of Ceará, in the Government of General Benjamin Liberato Barroso.

At the end of the 1920s, Padre Cícero began to lose his political strength, which practically ended after the Revolution of 1930. His prestige as a miracle worker however, would increase even more.

Despite some attempts to relate Batista to communism and, much later, to Liberation Theology, he was deeply anti-communist. In an interview given in 1931, he stated: "Communism was started by the Devil. Lucifer is his name and the dissemination of his doctrine is the war of the Devil against God. I know communism and I know that it's evil. It's the continuation of the war of the fallen angels against the Creator and His children."

Death
Batista died on July 20, 1934, in Juazeiro do Norte, Brazil, at the age of 90. He was buried in the Church of Our Lady of Perpetual Help.

Legacy

Today, a large statue of Batista stands in Juazeiro do Norte, where he is considered to be the patron saint of the city. A pilgrimage to this statue takes place in his honour every November, attracting hundreds of thousands of followers.

Batista was canonized by the Brazilian Catholic Apostolic Church, an Independent Catholic church. He is not recognized as a saint by the Catholic Church, though Pope Benedict XVI proposed a study on Batista as a candidate for canonization.

On 13 December 2015, as part of the opening ceremonies of the Holy Year proclaimed by Pope Francis, the Bishop of Crato, Fernando Panico, declared the rehabilitation of Batista's status with the Roman Catholic Church. He further declared Batista to have been a man of extraordinary virtues, formally reconciling him with the church.

Beatification process

On August 20, 2022, during a Mass held in Largo da Capela do Socorro, in Juazeiro do Norte, the bishop of the Diocese of Crato, announced that he had received a letter from the Dicastery for the Causes of Saints, the Vatican body responsible for beatification and canonization processes, informing about the authorization of Pope Francis for the opening of the beatification process of Batista. With the authorization of the Vatican, Batista automatically receives the title of "Servant of God".

References

External links
 Pequena Biografia do Padre Cícero - O Cearense do Século (archived copy)
 PORTAL PADRE CÍCERO (archived copy)

1844 births
1934 deaths
Brazilian Servants of God
People from Juazeiro do Norte
Folk saints
19th-century Brazilian Roman Catholic priests
19th-century venerated Christians 
20th-century Brazilian Roman Catholic priests
20th-century venerated Christians